Lilia Vaygina-Efremova (born April 15, 1977 in Cheboksary, Chuvashia, Soviet Union) is a Russian (until 2002), Belarusian (since 2002 till 2003), and Ukrainian (since 2003) biathlete.

Career
On February 16, 2006, she won the Winter Olympics bronze medal for the 7.5 km biathlon competition, becoming the first Ukrainian athlete to win a medal at the 2006 Winter Olympics.

References

External links
 

1977 births
Living people
People from Cheboksary
Biathletes at the 2006 Winter Olympics
Russian female biathletes
Belarusian female biathletes
Ukrainian female biathletes
Russian emigrants to Belarus 
Belarusian emigrants to Ukraine 
Naturalized citizens of Belarus
Naturalized citizens of Ukraine
Olympic biathletes of Ukraine
Olympic bronze medalists for Ukraine
Olympic medalists in biathlon
Medalists at the 2006 Winter Olympics
Sportspeople from Chuvashia